The Woman Under Oath is a 1919 American silent mystery film directed by John M. Stahl and starring stage star Florence Reed. As with the previous Stahl and Reed film, Her Code of Honor, it was produced by Tribune Productions and released by United Picture Theatres of America Incorporated.

Plot
As described in a film magazine, Edith Norton (McAvoy), hearing of the pending marriage of her betrayer Edward Knox (Powell), urges him to right the wrong he has done her. He refuses, so her sister Grace (Reed) shoots and kills him. Jim O'Neil (Hughes), who has come gunning for the man for a similar reason involving his fiancé Helen (Cheshire), is accused of the crime when he is discovered standing over the body. The police use a particularly disgusting third degree interrogation to drag a confession from the innocent man. He is brought to trial and Grace is drawn on the jury. At trial the six shooter is brandished per custom before the accused and jury with the usual effect. The circumstantial evidence convinces the eleven men on the jury that the defendant is guilty, but Grace holds out for acquittal. The judge directs that the jury be locked in for the night on Christmas Eve, and the men on the jury try to convince her of the man's guilt, but she is obdurate. Then a telegram arrives which informs her of her sister's death. Grace tells her story, and the men change their votes to "not guilty".

Cast

Preservation
The film survives today at the BFI National Archive.

References

External links

1919 films
American silent feature films
Films directed by John M. Stahl
American black-and-white films
American mystery films
1919 mystery films
1910s American films
Silent mystery films